Bunkar Mahasabha is a trade union of weavers in Varanasi, India. Bunkar Mahasabha was formed in 2001. The union is affiliated to the All India Central Council of Trade Unions.

Trade unions in India
All India Central Council of Trade Unions
Organisations based in Varanasi
Textile and clothing trade unions
Trade unions established in 2001
2001 establishments in Uttar Pradesh